Domenico di Cecco, also known by Domenico di Cecco di Baldi  (active mid-15th century) was an Italian painter of the Quattrocento.

Biography
He was born in Gubbio, and active there, where he was a pupil of Ottaviano Nelli. 
 In 1444, he painted a Grieving Madonna and St Peter for the church of Santa Maria della Piaggiola in Gubbio.

References

15th-century Italian painters
Quattrocento painters
Italian male painters
Year of birth unknown
Year of death unknown
People from Gubbio
Umbrian painters